Andrei Găluț (born 2 August 1984) is a former heavy metal singer from Romania. He won the 2007–08 season of Prima TV's Megastar He was the lead singer metalcore band Goodbye to Gravity from 2011 until 2015 when he was seriously injured in the Colectiv nightclub fire which killed the other four members of the band.

Personal life
Andrei Găluț was born in Arad, Romania. On 30 October 2015, he was hospitalized in serious condition with burns on 45% of his body after the Colectiv nightclub fire where his band was performing.

Musical career
After winning the Megastar competition (the Romanian equivalent of American Idol) organized by Prima TV in 2008, he was awarded a Member of Honor Diploma of the City of Arad, his hometown. He was the vocalist of Goodbye to Gravity, a metal band from Romania from 2011 to 2015, having performed during music festivals such as Best Fest Summer Camp in 2011 and Romanian Rock Meeting in 2011.

References

External links
 Official website for Goodbye to Gravity; accessed 16 November 2015.
 Official website archived copy as of 19 December 2014 (most recent usable snapshot; accessed 22 June 2021)
  Official Facebook page; accessed 22 June 2021

1984 births
Romanian rock singers
Living people
21st-century Romanian male singers
21st-century Romanian singers
People from Arad, Romania